The Caudron C.362 and the almost identical C.366 were single-seat racing aircraft built in 1933 by Caudron to compete in the Coupe Deutsch de la Meurthe competition.

Design
The C.362 and C.366 were single-seat, low-wing monoplanes with a fixed undercarriage. Construction was of wood, with a single-spar wing of symmetrical airfoil section, the spar having spruce flanges and a birch plywood web.  It was equipped with split trailing edge flaps.

The principal difference between the two types was the powerplant employed. The C.362 was powered by a high compression ratio version of the Renault Bengali air-cooled inverted four-cylinder inline engine developing  while the C.366 was powered by a  Regnier air-cooled inverted 6-cylinder inline. It had been intended to use this engine for all three aircraft, but development problems with it resulted in the use of the Renault engine in two of the airframes that had been constructed.

The type was developed into the Caudron C.450 and C.460 racers, which won the Coupe Deutsch de la Meurthe in 1934, 1935 and 1936.

Operational history

The following day the C.366, flown by Valot, was badly damaged in a landing accident, forcing its withdrawal from the competition.
 

The C.366 was flown to second place in the 1934 Coupe Deutsch de la Meurth by Louis Masotte, fitted with a Levasseur variable-pitch propeller.

Specifications (C.362)

References

C.362
Racing aircraft
Low-wing aircraft
Single-engined tractor aircraft
1930s French civil aircraft
Aircraft first flown in 1933